William Walsh Apted (born 15 October 1930) is a Fijian former cricketer. Apted was a right-handed batsman who bowled right-arm off break.

Apted made his first-class debut for Fiji in 1954 against Otago during Fiji's 1953/54 tour of New Zealand, where on debut he scored his maiden first-class half century with a score of 96. During the tour he played three further first-class matches, with his final first-class match for Fiji coming against Auckland.

In his 4 first-class matches for Fiji he scored 408 runs at a batting average of 51.00, with three half centuries and a single century score of 102 against Canterbury.

Apted also represented Fiji in 21 non first-class matches for Fiji from 1954 to 1960, including in their famous win in 1956 against the touring West Indians. Apted's final match for Fiji came against Newcastle during their 1959/60 tour of Australia.

External links
William Apted at Cricinfo
William Apted at CricketArchive

1930 births
Living people
Fijian cricketers
Sportspeople from Suva
Fijian people of Welsh descent
Wicket-keepers